Made in Germany is a compilation album by American recording artist Wanda Jackson. It was released in 1967 via Capitol Records and contained 16 previously released tracks. It was Jackson's first compilation released outside of the American market. The songs included for the album were recorded entirely in the German language. Some of these tracks had been released as singles internationally and became successful. This included the number one single, "Santo Domingo", which was first released in 1965.

Background, content and release
Wanda Jackson had become known in North America as a Rockabilly and Country performer, with English language singles such as "Fujiyama Mama" (1958), "Let's Have a Party" (1960) and "Right or Wrong". After reaching a period of limited commercial success, Jackson's label (Capitol Records) asked if she could record a selection of songs for the German music market. Jackson agreed and flew to Cologne, Germany to work alongside Austrian record producer Otto Demler. Between March and October 1965, Demler recorded a series of German language songs, beginning with "Santo Domingo". In her autobiography, Jackson recounted recording all of the music without any of the musicians present since their sessions had previously been recorded.

In 1967, Made in Germany was released on Capitol Records in conjunction with their German imprint, Electrola Records. The album was issued as a vinyl LP, containing eight tracks on either side. It was Jackson's first compilation released entirely for international music markets. The album consisted of material previously released to German language markets. Several of these tracks had been single releases as well: "Santo Domingo", "Morgen, Ja Morgen", "Doch dann kam Johnny", "Komm Heim, Mein Wandersmann", "Wer an Das Meer Sein Herz Verliert", "Wenn Der Abschied Kommt", "Vom Winde Verweht" and "Addio My Love". "Santo Domingo" had reached the number one spot on the German music chart in 1965. In 2021, it was re-released to digital and streaming sites with an expanded track listing.

Track listing

Vinyl version

Digital version

Release history

References

1967 compilation albums
Capitol Records compilation albums
German-language albums
Wanda Jackson compilation albums